James L. McGaugh (born December 17, 1931) is an American neurobiologist and author working in the field of learning and memory.  He is a Distinguished Professor Emeritus in the Department of Neurobiology and Behavior at the University of California, Irvine and a fellow and founding director of the Center for the Neurobiology of Learning and Memory.

Education and positions

McGaugh received his B.A. from San Jose State University in 1953 and his Ph.D. in psychology from the University of California, Berkeley, in 1959.  He was briefly a professor at San Jose State and then did postdoctoral work in neuropharmacology with Nobel Laureate Professor Daniel Bovet at the Istituto Superiore di Sanitá in Rome, Italy. He then became a professor at the University of Oregon from 1961 to 1964.  He was recruited to the University of California, Irvine, in 1964 (the year of the school's founding) to be the founding chair of the Department of Psychobiology (now Neurobiology and Behavior).  He became second dean (1967–1970) of the School of Biological Sciences following Edward Steinhaus, then Vice Chancellor (1975–1977) and executive Vice Chancellor (1978–1982) of the university.  In 1982, he founded the Center for the Neurobiology of Learning and Memory and remained director from 1982 to 2004.

Early research findings

McGaugh's early work (in the 1950s and 1960s) demonstrated that memories are not instantly created in a long-term, permanent fashion.  Rather, immediately after a learning event, the memory is labile and susceptible to influence.  As time passes, the memory becomes increasingly resistant to external influences and eventually becomes stored in a relatively permanent manner, a process termed memory consolidation.  McGaugh found that drugs, given to an animal shortly after a learning event, influence the subsequent retention of that event. The concept of such "post-training" manipulations is one of McGaugh's greatest contributions to the field of learning and memory because it avoids many potential confounds, such as performance effects of the drug, that may occur when a drug or other treatment is given prior to the training.

Over the ensuing decades, McGaugh and his research colleagues and students extended the findings into a long-term investigation of emotionally influenced memory consolidation.  As most people realize, they have stronger memories for long-ago events that were emotionally arousing in nature, compared with memories for emotionally neutral events (which may not be remembered well at all).  McGaugh's research examined how emotional arousal influences memory consolidation.  In particular, he has found that stress hormones, such as epinephrine and cortisol, mediate much of the effects of emotional arousal on subsequent retention of the event.  These hormones, in turn, activate a variety of brain structures, including the amygdala, which appears to play a key role in modulating memory consolidation.  The amygdala, when activated, influences a variety of other brain structures, including the hippocampus, nucleus accumbens and caudate nucleus that process different aspects of memory.  It is through this "orchestration" of brain structures that memories are eventually formed and stored, though the exact nature of memory storage remains elusive.

Honors received

McGaugh has been recognized in honor of his achievements, accomplishments, and contributions to the field of learning and memory.  In 1981 he was honored with the Distinguished Scientific Contribution Award from the American Psychological Association.  He received a Merit Award from the National Institute of Mental Health in 1987.  McGaugh was elected a member of the U.S. National Academy of Sciences in 1989 and was also elected a member of the Brazilian and Mexican academies of science. He was elected a fellow of the American Academy of Arts and Sciences and has served as president of the Association for Psychological Science and the Western Psychological Association. He was selected as a William James Fellow, Association for Psychological Science, 1989.  Other honors include the John P. McGovern Award from the American Association for the Advancement of Science, 1996 and the Robert S. Dow Neuroscience Award, 2000.  The University of L'Aquila, Italy, honored him with the Laurea Honoris Causa in 2001.  In 2006 the Western Psychological Association awarded him Lifetime Achievement Award.  He received the Norman Anderson Lifetime Achievement Award from the Society of Experimental Psychologists in 2008 where he was elected a Fellow in 1991. He was also honored in 2009 with the Karl Lashley Prize in Neuroscience from the American Philosophical Society.  In 2015 he received the Grawemeyer Award for Psychology [(University of Louisville)].  He was also presented with a Lifetime Achievement Award [(Department of Neurobiology and Behavior, University of California, Irvine)] in 2015. The University of California, Irvine, honored him with the UCI medal in 1992 and the naming of a building after him, McGaugh Hall, in 2001.   McGaugh plays sax and clarinet in a jazz ensemble, a swing band and a concert band.

Publications 

Selected publications (out of 558):

 McGaugh, J. L.  Time-dependent processes in memory storage.  Science, 1966, 153, 1351–1358.
 McGaugh, J. L.  Memory:  A Century of Consolidation.  Science, 2000, 287, 248–251.
 McGaugh, J.L. and Roozendaal, B.  Role of adrenal stress hormones in forming lasting memories in the brain.  Current Opinion in Neurobiology, 2002, 12, 205–210.
 McGaugh, J.L.  Memory consolidation and the amygdala:  A systems perspective.  Trends in Neurosciences, 2002, 25, 456–461.
 McGaugh, J.L.  Memory and Emotion:  The Making of Lasting Memories.  London:  Weidenfeld and Nicolson The Orion House Group Ltd. and New York:  Columbia University Press, 2003, 162 pp.
 LaLumiere, R.T., Buen, T.-V., and McGaugh, J.L.  Posttraining intra-basolateral amygdala infusions of norepinephrine enhance consolidation of memory for contextual fear conditioning. Journal of Neuroscience, 2003, 23, 6754-6758
 Okuda, S., Roozendaal, B. and McGaugh, J.L.  Glucocorticoid effects on object recognition memory require training-associated emotional arousal. Proceedings, National Academy of Sciences, USA, 2004, 101, 853–858.
 McGaugh, J.L.  The amygdala modulates the consolidation of memories of emotionally arousing experiences.  Annual Review of Neuroscience, 2004, 27, 1-28.
 McIntyre, C.K., Miyashita, T., Setlow, B., Marjon, K.D., Steward, O., Guzowski, J.F. and McGaugh, J.L.  Memory-influencing intra-basolateral amygdala drug infusions modulate expression of Arc protein in the hippocampus. Proceedings, National Academy of Sciences, USA, 2005, 102, 10718–10723.
 Malin, E. and McGaugh, J.L.  Differential involvement of the hippocampus, anterior cingulate cortex and basolateral amygdala in memory for context and footshock.  Proceedings, National Academy of Sciences, 2006, 103, 1959–1963.
 Berlau, D.J. and McGaugh, J.L.  Enhancement of extinction memory consolidation: The role of the noradrenergic and GABAergic
 Parker, E.S., Cahill, L. and McGaugh, J.L..  A case of unusual autobiographical remembering.  Neurocase, 2006, 12, 35–49.
 Roozendaal, B., Okuda, S., de Quervain, D. J-F, and McGaugh, J.L.  Glucocorticoids interact with emotion-induced noradrenergic activation in influencing different memory functions.  Neuroscience, 2006, 138, 901–910.
 Prado-Alcala, R.A., Diaz del Guante, M.A., Garin-Aguilar, M.E., Diaz-Trujillo, A., Quirarte, G., and McGaugh, J.L.  Amygdala or hippocampus inactivation after retrieval induces temporary memory deficit.  Neurobiology of Learning and Memory, 2006, 86, 144–149.
 McGaugh, J.L.  Make mild moments memorable:  Add a little arousal. Trends in Cognitive Sciences, 2006, 10, 345–347.
 Green, K.N., Billings, L.M., Roozendaal, B., McGaugh, J.L. and LaFerla, F.M.  Glucocorticoids increase amyloid-b and tau pathology in a mouse model of Alzheimers Disease.  Journal of Neuroscience, 2006, 26, 9047–9056.
 Hui, I.R., Hui, G., Roozendaal, B., McGaugh, J.L. and Weinberger, N.M.  Posttraining handling facilitates auditory-cue fear conditioning in rats.  Neurobiology of Learning and Memory, 2006, 86, 160–163.
 Roozendaal, B., Hui, G.K., Hui, I.R., Berlau, D.J., McGaugh, J.L. and Weinberger, N.M.  Basolateral amygdala noradrenergic activity mediates corticosterone-induced enhancement of auditory fear conditioning.  Neurobiology of Learning and Memory, 2006, 86, 249–255.
 McGaugh, J.L.  Make mild moments memorable:  Add a little arousal. Trends in Cognitive Sciences, 2006, 10, 345–347.
 Green, K.N., Billings, L.M., Roozendaal, B., McGaugh, J.L. and LaFerla, F.M.  Glucocorticoids increase amyloid-b and tau pathology in a mouse model of Alzheimers Disease.  Journal of Neuroscience, 2006, 26, 9047–9056.
 Billings, L.M., Green, K.N., McGaugh, J.L. and LaFerla, F.M.  Learning decreases Aβ*56 and tau pathology and ameliorates behavioral decline in 3xT-AD mice.  Journal of Neuroscience, 2007, 27, 751–761.
 Malin, E.L., Ibrahim, D.Y., Tu, J.W. and McGaugh, J.L.  Involvement of the rostral anterior cingulate cortex in consolidation of inhibitory avoidance memory: Interaction with the basolateral amygdala. Neurobiology of Learning and Memory, 2007, 87, 295–302.
 Roozendaal, B., Lengvilas, R., McGaugh, J.L., Civelli, O. and Reinscheid, R.K.  Orphanin FQ-nociceptin interactions with the basolateral amygdala noradrenergic system in memory consolidation.  Learning and Memory, 2007, 14, 29–35.
 McGaugh, J.L.  Searching for memory in the brain:  Confronting the collusion of cells and systems.  In:  Neural Plasticity and Memory:  From Genes to Brain Imaging,  Bermudez-Rattoni, F., ed.,  Taylor and Francis: Boca Raton, FL, 2007, pp. 1–14.
 Ferry, B. and McGaugh, J.L.  Involvement of basolateral amygdala  α2-adrenoceptors in modulating consolidation of inhibitory avoidance memory.  Learning and Memory, 2008, 15, 238–243.
 McGaugh, J.L. and Roozendaal, B.  Modulation of memory.  Scholarpedia, 2008, 3(6):3453.
 Roozendaal, B., Schelling, G. and McGaugh, J.L. Corticotropin-releasing factor in the basolateral amygdala enhances memory consolidation via an interaction with the β-adrenoceptor-cAMP pathway:
 Miranda, M.I., Quirarte, G.L., Rodriguez-Garcia, G., McGaugh, J.L. and Roozendaal, B.  Glucocorticoids enhance taste aversion memory via actions in the insular cortex and basolateral amygdala.  Learning and Memory, 2008, 15, 468–476.
 Roozendaal, B., Castello, N., Vedana, G., Barsegyan, A. and McGaugh, J.L.  Noradrenergic activation of the basolateral amygdala modulates consolidation of object recognition memory. Neurobiology of Learning and Memory, 2008, 90, 576–579.
 Balderas, I., Rodriguez-Ortiz, C.J., Salgado-Tonda, P., Hurtado, J., McGaugh, J.L. and Bermudez-Rattoni, F.  The consolidation of object and context recognition memory involve different regions of the temporal lobe.  Learning and Memory, 2008, 15, 618–624.
 McGaugh, J.L. and Roozendaal, B.  Memory Modulation.  In:  H. Eichenbaum (Ed.) Memory Systems  Vol. (3) of Learning and Memory:  A Comprehensive Reference, 4 vols. (J. Byrne Editor), pp. 521–554 Oxford: Elsevier, 2008.  Also reprinted in: Concise Learning and Memory: The Editor's Selection,  J.H. Byrne (Ed.), Academic Press, London, pp. 571–603, 2009.
 McGaugh, J.L. and Roozendaal, B.  Drug enhancement of memory consolidation:  Historical perspective and neurobiological implications. Psychopharmacology, 202, 2009, 3–14.
 Boccia, M.M., Blake, M.G., Baratti, C.M. and McGaugh, J.L. Involvement of the basolateral amygdala in muscarinic cholinergic modulation of extinction memory consolidation.  Neurobiology of Learning and Memory, 91, 2009, 93–97.
 Roozendaal., B. and McGaugh, J.L.  Emotional hormones and memory modulation.  In:  Squire, LR (ed.) Encyclopedia of Neuroscience, volume 3. Oxford:  Academic Press. pp. 933–940, 2009.
 Chavez, C.M., McGaugh, J.L. and Weinberger, N.M.   The basolateral amygdala modulates specific sensory memory representations in the cerebral cortex.  Neurobiology of Learning and Memory, 91, 2009, 382–392.
 Campolongo, P., Roozendaal, B., Trezza, V., Hauer, D., Schelling, G., McGaugh, J.L. and Cuomo, V.  Endocannabinoids in the rat basolateral amygdala enhance memory consolidation:  Involvement of the glucocorticoid system.  Proceedings, National Academy of Sciences, USA, 106, 2009, 4888–4893.
 Campolongo, P., Roozendaal, B., Trezza, V., Cuomo, V., Astarita, G., McGaugh, J.L. and Piomelli, D.  The fat-induced satiety factor OEA enhances memory consolidation.  Proceedings, National Academy of Sciences USA, 106, 2009, 8027–8031.
 Roozendaal, B., McReynolds, J., Van der Zee, E., Lee, S., McGaugh, J.L. and McIntyre, C.  Glucocorticoid effects on memory consolidation depend on functional interactions between the medial prefrontal cortex and basolateral amygdala.  Journal of Neuroscience, 29, 2009, 14299–14308.
 Leport, A.K.R., Mattfeld, A.T., Dickinson-Anson, H., Fallon, J.H., Stark, C.E.L., Kruggel, F.R., Cahill, L. and McGaugh, J.L.  A behavioral and neuroanatomical investigation of highly superior autobiographical memory.  Neurobiology of Learning and Memory, 98, 2012, 78–92.
 McIntyre, C.K., McGaugh, J.L. and Williams, C.L.  Interacting brain systems modulate memory consolidation.  Neuroscience & Biobehavioral Reviews, 36, 2012, 1750–1762.
 McGaugh, J.L.  Making lasting memories:  Remembering the significant.  Proceedings, National Academy of Sciences, USA, 110 (2), 2013, 10401–10407.
 McGaugh, J.L. and Leport, A.  Highly superior autobiographical memory.  Scientific American, February 2014, 40–45.
 Barsegyan, A, McGaugh, J.L and Roozendaal, B.  Noradrenergic activation of the basolateral amygdala modulates the consolidation of object-in-context recognition memory. Frontiers in Behavioral Neuroscience, 2014. Doi: 10:3389/fnbeh.2014.00160
 McGaugh, J.L.  Consolidating Memories.  Annual Review of Psychology, 66, 2015, 1-24.

References

External links
Guide to the James L. McGaugh Awards. Special Collections and Archives, The UC Irvine Libraries, Irvine, California.

American cognitive neuroscientists
Memory researchers
Fellows of the Society of Experimental Psychologists
Fellows of the American Academy of Arts and Sciences
Members of the United States National Academy of Sciences
University of California, Berkeley alumni
University of California, Irvine faculty
Living people
1931 births